PrincessSoft is a Japanese company. It specializes in the development of visual novel video games ports for use on home video game consoles such as the PlayStation 2 and the defunct Dreamcast. It has two imprints: Primavera, which specializes in female oriented products, and Nine's Fox, which also releases ports of adult visual novels. None of the three brands have released any products since 2009.

Games

PrincessSoft
Furimukeba Tonari ni (2001)
Day of Love (2001)
Nukumori no Naka de ~in the warmth~ (2001)
D+Vine Luv (2001)
21-Two One- (2001)
Yukinko☆Burning (2002)
Nijuuei (2002)
Hourglass of Summer (2002)
Suika (2002)
Mei☆Puru (2002)
Happy Breeding (2003)
Kimi ga Nozomu Eien (2003)
Phantom of Inferno (2003)
Cafe Little Wish ~Mahou no Recipe~ (2003)
Marginal ~Ano Toki no Tooi Yakusoku wo~ (2003)Sakura: Setsugetsuka(2003)Natsuiro Komachi <Ichiji Senka> (2003)Lost Passage ~Ushinawareta Hitofushi~ (2003)MoeKan (2003)Te no Hira o, Taiyou ni ~Eikyuu no Kizuna~ (2004)3LDK: Shiawase ni Narō yo (2004)F Fanatic (2004)W Wish (2004)Final Approach (2004)Natsuiro ~Hoshikuzu no Memory~ (2004)Doko e Iku no, Ano Hi ~Hikaru Ashita e...~ (2005)Cafe Lindbergh ~Summer Season~ (2005)Lovely Idol (2005)Magical Tale (2005)Home Maid (2005)Hatsukoi -first kiss- (2005)Sora-iro no Organ (2005)Rune Princess (2005)White Clarity (2005)Finalist (2006)TsuyoKiss: Mighty Heart (2006):Quartett! The Stage of Love (2006)Hokenshitsu e Youkoso (2006)Yumemishi (2006)Que: Ancient Leaf no Yousei (with 5pb., 2007)Iinazuke (2007)Star Train: Your Past Makes Your Future (2007)Final Approach 2: 1st Priority (2008)Yumemi Hakusho (2008)Kira Kira ~Rock n'Roll Show~ (2009)

PrimaveraKimiSuta ~Kimi to Study~ (2006)Trouble Fortune Company Happy Cure (2007)

Nine's FoxQuilt ~Anata to Tsumugu Yume to Koi no Dress~ (2007)Yatohime Zankikou -Ken no Maki- (2007)Shikaku Tantei Sora no Sekai ~Thousand Dreams~ (2007)Colorful Aquarium -My Little Mermaid- (2007)Nettai Teikiatsu Shoujo (2007)Gin no Eclipse ''(2008)

References

External links
  
 

Video game companies of Japan